Waitsfield is a town in Washington County, Vermont, United States. The population was 1,844 as of the 2020 census. It was created by a Vermont charter on February 25, 1782, and was granted to militia Generals Benjamin Wait, Roger Enos and others. The town was named after Wait.

Geography

Waitsfield is located in the valley of the Mad River, between the main range of the Green Mountains to the west and the Northfield Mountains to the east. Vermont Route 100 runs through the valley, connecting Waterbury to the north, with Warren and Rochester to the south. Vermont Route 17 leaves Route 100 to the west, heading over the Green Mountains past the Mad River Glen ski area, eventually reaching Bristol.

The primary villages in town are Waitsfield and Irasville, located along Route 100. Waitsfield Common is near the geographic center of the town.

Schools 
Children in Waitsfield attend Waitsfield Elementary School and Harwood Union High School.

Demographics

The 2000 census stated that there were 1,659 people, 734 households, and 485 families residing in the town. The population density was 61.7 people per square mile (23.8/km2). There were 908 housing units at an average density of 33.7 per square mile (13.0/km2). The racial makeup of the town was 97.23% White, 0.96% African American, 0.24% Native American, 0.48% Asian, 0.06% Pacific Islander, 0.30% from other races, and 0.72% from two or more races. Hispanic or Latino of any race were 1.21% of the population.

There were 734 households, out of which 29.4% had children under the age of 18 living with them, 55.2% were married couples living together, 8.2% had a female householder with no husband present, and 33.9% were non-families. 25.5% of all households were made up of individuals, and 6.5% had someone living alone who was 65 years of age or older. The average household size was 2.26 and the average family size was 2.73.

In the town, the population was spread out, with 21.3% under the age of 18, 6.6% from 18 to 24, 32.2% from 25 to 44, 27.7% from 45 to 64, and 12.2% who were 65 years of age or older. The median age was 40 years. For every 100 females, there were 96.3 males. For every 100 females age 18 and over, there were 97.3 males.

The median income for a household in the town was $45,577, and the median income for a family was $54,868. Males had a median income of $31,827 versus $27,260 for females. The per capita income for the town was $24,209. About 3.9% of families and 5.9% of the population were below the poverty line, including 7.1% of those under age 18 and 2.0% of those age 65 or over.

Notable people

 Ralph Ellison, American author
 Bill Parker, artist and inventor
 Grace Potter, musician of Grace Potter and the Nocturnals
 Edmund Rice, US congressman from Minnesota
 Henry Mower Rice, US senator from Minnesota
 Charles W. Waterman, US senator from Colorado

Economy

The town's economy is based around two nearby ski resorts, Sugarbush Resort and Mad River Glen. Each resort has a different focus: Mad River Glen is the oldest skier owned and skier-only resort on the East Coast and is home to the unique, Single Chair lift. Sugarbush is a tourist resort and in recent years has added several new condominiums and a hotel.

Waitsfield is also home to several restaurants. The most well known is American Flatbread: a locally owned restaurant that serves wood-fired pizzas with local ingredients. The Big Picture, a restaurant and movie theater, is also located in the town.

During the summer months, Lareau Farm and the Covered Bridge are popular swimming locations along the Mad River.

A long-running Christmas-themed commercial for Miller High Life beer was filmed in Waitsfield in 1976.

Notes

External links
 Town of Waitsfield official website
 Waitsfield VT – VT Living Magazine

 
Towns in Vermont
Towns in Washington County, Vermont
1782 establishments in Vermont